Achladochori is a village in the Trikala Prefecture in Thessaly, Greece. It forms part of the municipal unit of Farkadona, in the municipality of the same name. According to the 2011 census, its population was 103.

The village features a 13th-century church dedicated to the Dormition of the Theotokos.

References

Villages in Greece
Populated places in Trikala (regional unit)
Byzantine church buildings in Thessaly